Jagdgeschwader z. b. V. (JG z. b. V.) (roughly 'Fighter Wing for special deployment') was a Luftwaffe fighter wing of World War II. The abbreviation z. b. V. is German and stands for  zur besonderen Verwendung (for special deployment). 

JG z.b.V. was formed April 20, 1944 in Kassel, to control III./JG 3, I./JG 5, II./JG 27, III./JG 54 and II./JG 53. On June 15, 1944 it was redesignated Stab/JG 4 and its first Geschwaderkommodore was Major Gerhard Michalski.  In 1944 JG z. b. V. was subordinated to the 7. Jagd-Division and used in the Reichsluftverteidigung (Defense of the Reich) from bases in Kassel and Ansbach.

Commanding officers
 Major Gerhard Michalski, 20 April 1944 – 20 May 1944
 Hauptmann Walther Dahl, 20 May 1944 – 6 June 1944
 Major Gerhard Schöpfel, 6 June 1944 – 15 June 1944

Fighter wings of the Luftwaffe 1933-1945
Military units and formations established in 1944
Military units and formations disestablished in 1944